All-Asian Satellite Television and Radio Operator, doing business as Astro, is a Malaysian satellite television and IPTV provider. It operates in Malaysia and Brunei and operates from the All Asia Broadcast Centre (AABC) in Kuala Lumpur and MEASAT in Cyberjaya. In 2016, the company was recorded as achieving 71% household penetration in Malaysia. It was granted an exclusive license as the sole pay-television provider by the Malaysian federal government until 2017. Astro is a wholly-owned subsidiary of Astro Malaysia Holdings Berhad and is operated by MEASAT Broadcast Network Systems Sdn. Bhd.

Astro launched the high-definition platform Astro B.yond in 2009 and the IPTV platform Astro IPTV in 2011, with the latter targeted at consumers who were unable to receive the company's satellite services.

Astro formerly operated in Indonesia from 2006 to 2008, under the  brand and was operated by PT Direct Vision.

List of Astro digital brands
 Astro Awani - Astro's Flagship News Network.
 Gempak - Malay entertainment website.
 Rojak Daily - Gempak's subpage; originally as standalone website.
 Go Shop - Home shopping service under the joint venture with GS Group – Astro GS Shop Sdn Bhd.
 Sooka - Television streaming service, served as Astro content platform.
 Stadium Astro - Sports news website.
 Ulagam - Indian news and entertainment website.
 Xuan - Chinese news and entertainment website.
 Hotspot - Xuan's subpage; originally as standalone website.

Criticism and controversies

Monopoly over paid television market
Astro has been criticised for its monopolistic practices in which it has become the dominant paid television service in Malaysia while its competitors ABNXcess, Mega TV, and MiTV were not able to compete against Astro and became defunct after Astro's launch. Astro was the sole paid television operator in Malaysia until 2017 when another competitor, Telekom Malaysia's Unifi TV, emerged as a strong cord-cutting alternative.

The Malaysian government's plan to regulate Android-based set-top boxes in 2019 raised concerns that Astro's dominance over the country's television content market would be enhanced. While Astro's exclusive rights to Malaysian broadcast content expired in 2017, the company continues to have non-exclusive broadcast privileges under the Communications and Multimedia Act 1998. Starting in 2022, the Malaysian Communications and Multimedia Commission will provide Content Applications Service Provider (CASP) licenses to 35 broadcasting companies, four of which are approved to deliver content via satellite television.

Sports content dispute
Astro has also enjoyed control of the broadcasting rights for sports events, including all Liga Super and Piala Malaysia events, and the FIFA World Cup 2014 and 2018. Competitors were restricted from airing those events, or were required by regulators to pay excessive royalties to Astro. The high royalty fees were criticised by Jeremy Kung, executive vice president of TM New Media, who argued that sports content on free-to-air television channels should be made available to public for free. Former Information, Communications, Arts and Culture minister Rais Yatim urged the media groups who had exclusive rights to major sports events to share their content to free-to-air television channels. Pakatan Harapan youth chief Nik Nazmi Nik Ahmad argued that the rights to broadcast English Premier League should be co-licensed with Radio Television Malaysia instead of restricted to Astro.

Astro's short-lived Indonesian operations were also subject of investigation by Indonesian regulators, and accusations by rival providers, over allegations of the company also monopolizing Premier League rights in the country.

Overcharging
Astro has been criticised for raising its service prices and imposing penalty fees on customers. In 2007, Astro raised its service fee about 15% and converted previously free channels like Bloomberg, Al Jazeera English, and CGTN into paid channels. Anyone who attempted to drop such service packages was charged a fee. Malaysiakini reporter Cheah Kah Seng encouraged customers to protest against the price hikes and provided instructions on how to do so. Due to broadcasting rights it has received from the Malaysian government, Astro raised its fees several more times in the following years, while consumers had fewer competitive alternatives. 

Astro often shows commercials on premium channels for which consumers paid for an ad-free experience. Customers who use the Astro personal video recorder (PVR), Astro MAX, have reported performance problems and difficulty in recording certain channels.

See also
 Astro Channel List
 Television in Malaysia
 Digital television in Malaysia
 Kristal-Astro

References

External links
 Official website

 1996 establishments in Malaysia
 Television in Malaysia
 Astro Malaysia Holdings
 Satellite television
 Privately held companies of Malaysia